611 Folsom Street may refer to anything of or relating to the NSA warrantless surveillance controversy and may also refer directly to:
AT&T's regional switching center, San Francisco.
Room 641A, located on the sixth floor at AT&T's switching center.
NSA warrantless surveillance controversy.
Wiretapping
Mark Klein, a whistle-blower uncovering U.S. federal spying program.
San Luis Obispo, data center which routed data to Folsom address.